Jody Bowry (previously Jody Smith; born 1980/1981) is an English former professional football goalkeeper who played for clubs including Chelsea and Fulham.

Club career
Bowry signed for Chelsea as a 15-year-old and immediately went into the first team. In 2000 "widely admired" Bowry was a "star close-season signing" for Fulham, who had become the first full-time professional women's club in Europe. In December 2001 Fulham signed Astrid Johannessen who competed with Bowry for the goalkeeping position until 2003 when the club lost its professional status.

Personal life
Bowry is from West Byfleet. She was among the first female members of the Professional Footballers Association (PFA) and studied a Sports Science and Coaching degree with their assistance. She later worked as a school teacher.

Honours

Fulham
FA Women's Premier League National Division: 2002–03
FA Women's Premier League Southern Division: 2001–02
South East Combination Women's Football League: 2000–01
FA Women's Cup: 2001–02, 2002–03
FA Women's Premier League Cup: 2001–02, 2002–03

References

External links
Profile at Fulham FC

Date of birth missing (living people)
Living people
Footballers from Surrey
English women's footballers
Chelsea F.C. Women players
Fulham L.F.C. players
FA Women's National League players
Women's association football goalkeepers
Schoolteachers from Surrey
Year of birth missing (living people)